Francisco Macías Nguema (Africanised to Masie Nguema Biyogo Ñegue Ndong; 1 January 1924 – 29 September 1979), often mononymously referred to as Macías, was an Equatoguinean politician who served as the first President of Equatorial Guinea from the country's independence in 1968 until his overthrow in 1979. He is widely remembered as one of the most brutal dictators in history.

A member of the Fang people, Macías held numerous official positions under Spanish colonial rule before being elected the first president of the soon-to-be independent country in 1968. Early in his rule, he consolidated power by establishing an extreme cult of personality, a one-party state ruled by his United National Workers' Party and declaring himself president for life in 1972, which was then ratified by a referendum the following year. Due to his dictatorship's severe human rights abuses and economic mismanagement, tens of thousands of people fled the country to avoid persecution. This led to Equatorial Guinea being internationally nicknamed the "Dachau of Africa". His rule also led to significant brain drain as intellectuals and educated classes were particular targets for his persecution. In 1979, he was overthrown in a coup d'état by his nephew Teodoro Obiang Nguema Mbasogo and was subsequently tried and executed.

Depending on the source, during his government, anywhere from 50,000 to 80,000 of the 300,000 to 400,000 people living in the country at the time were killed. He has been compared to Pol Pot because of the violent, unpredictable, and anti-intellectual nature of his government.

Background and early life 
Francisco Macías Nguema was born at Nfengha, Spanish Guinea, to parents from Woleu-Ntem Province, Gabon. He belonged to the Esangui clan, part of the Fang, Equatorial Guinea's majority ethnic group. His family settled in Mongomo, where he grew up. Macías Nguema was the son of a witch doctor who allegedly killed his younger brother. In his childhood, he was educated at a Catholic school.

Possible mental illness 
Medical reports from his early career suggested that Macías Nguema was mentally unstable. Based on a report from 1968, the French foreign intelligence service SDECE argued that he suffered from mental disorders and venereal diseases whose effects on his psyche were made even worse by his regular abuse of drugs such as cannabis in the form of the edible derivative bhang, and iboga, a drink with strong hallucinogenic effects. Several contemporaries, such as the French ambassador to Equatorial Guinea, argued that Macías Nguema was insane. Some observers have posited that Macías Nguema may have been a psychopath, a disorder potentially enabled, in part, by reported childhood psychological trauma, and that his behaviour could have been affected by other possible mental illnesses, as well as his reported periodic use of drugs. Journalist Paul Kenyon described Macías Nguema as "dangerously mentally ill".

Early career
Macías Nguema failed the civil service exam three times. Regardless, he eventually became a clerk in the Spanish colonial administration, serving as court interpreter. In 1961, he first travelled to Madrid as spokesperson for a delegation which honoured Francisco Franco, Spain's dictator, on the 25th anniversary of his seizure of power. At the time, Macías Nguema generally displayed no anti-Spanish sentiment, and collaborated with the authorities. Unlike many Equatoguinean activists at the time, he was never jailed by the Spanish.

As court interpreter, Macías Nguema eventually began taking bribes to manipulate his translations to absolve or incriminate defendants. The Spanish interpreted his important role in many trials as evidence for influence and talent for leadership, and began to rapidly promote him. He became assistant interpreter, mayor of Mongomo, minister of public works, and finally deputy president of the Governing Council within a single year. He also served as a member of the territorial parliament. Even at this early point of his career, Macías Nguema already exhibited erratic tendencies. In a conference to discuss the future independence of Equatorial Guinea at Madrid, he suddenly began an "incoherent eulogy of the Nazis", claiming that Adolf Hitler had wanted to save Africans from colonialism and only got "confused", causing him to attempt to conquer Europe. At one point he declared himself a "Hitlerian-Marxist".

In 1964, Macías Nguema was named deputy prime minister of the autonomous transition government. Around this time, Macías Nguema himself came to fear that he was mentally unstable. Before the 1968 Spanish Guinean general election, aged 44, he travelled to Madrid, where he was treated at the Ruben clinic. Despite these concerns, Macías Nguema ran for president of the soon-to-be independent country against Prime Minister Bonifacio Ondó Edu on a strongly nationalist platform in 1968. He employed a Spanish lawyer to write his texts, providing him with a coherent agenda, and made various promises to improve his popularity. He would point at European-owned houses and ask the crowds if they wanted to own the place; when they responded positively, he stated that he would give them to the listeners if they voted for him. However, Macías Nguema was easily distracted from his speeches, and often made "chaotic public appearances". His bouts of erratic behavior were generally believed to be the sign of a  "fearless" and "charming" leader. In what has been the only free election held in the country to date, he defeated Ondó Edu in the runoff and was sworn in as president on 12 October.

Presidency

Early rule 
After assuming power, Macías Nguema began to hold inflammatory, anti-European speeches and claimed that there were plots to overthrow him. His rival Bonifacio Ondó Edu fled to Gabon. In March 1969, Macías Nguema arrested his own foreign minister on treason charges and executed him by defenestrating him. Edu was also captured and brought back to Equatorial Guinea, where he and several other senior officials were killed at Black Beach. The Spanish government subsequently organized the evacuation of all its citizens, while the British ambassador described the Equatoguinean capital as being in a state of total chaos. At this point, Macías Nguema still recognized his mental instability and again sought help. After assuming the presidency, he made a secret trip to Barcelona and visited a psychiatrist for help. Although little was known about what advice the Spanish expert gave Macías Nguema, Kenyon argued that the treatment appeared to have failed considering the President's subsequent development. Macías Nguema also persisted in consuming large amounts of drugs. On Christmas Eve 1969, he had 186 suspected dissidents executed in the national football stadium in Malabo. While the executions were going on, amplifiers played Mary Hopkin's song "Those Were the Days". 150 were shot or hanged with the remaining 36 being ordered to dig ditches in which they were buried up to their necks and eaten alive by red ants over the next few days.

On 7 May 1971, Macías Nguema issued Decree 415, which repealed parts of the 1968 Constitution and granted him "all direct powers of Government and Institutions", including powers formerly held by the legislative and judiciary branches, as well as the cabinet of ministers. On 18 October 1971, Law 1 imposed the death penalty as punishment for threatening the President or the government. Insulting or offending the President or his cabinet was punishable by 30 years in prison. On 14 July 1972, a presidential decree merged all existing political parties into the United National Party (later the United National Workers' Party), with Macías Nguema as President for Life of both the nation and the party. Fearing that the Spanish wanted to overthrow him, Macías Nguema offered promotions and other rewards to anyone who revealed a Spanish spy; this led to a climate of fear and suspicion, as owning the wrong book or having talked with the wrong person could result in punishment, imprisonment or death.

Having turned against Spain, Macías Nguema allied with the Eastern Bloc, enlisting support by the Soviet Union, Cuba, and North Korea. He allowed the Soviets to channel weapons through Equatorial Guinea to the MPLA in Angola, while repeatedly threatening to terminate this alliance in order to blackmail the Eastern Bloc into providing him with money. The Cubans and North Koreans provided Macías Nguema with soldiers and bodyguards; his relationship with North Korea remained good until his overthrow. He admired the North Korean dictator Kim Il-sung, and according to his daughter Monique Macías, the two were friends.

Totalitarian dictatorship

Growing paranoia and cult of personality 
In a plebiscite held on 29 July 1973, the 1968 Constitution was replaced with a new document that gave Macías Nguema absolute power and formally made his party the only one legally permitted in the country. According to official figures, 99 percent of voters approved the new document. Macías Nguema went on to establish a totalitarian regime with three important pillars: the United National Workers' Party, the Juventud en Marcha con Macías (JMM; English: "Youth on the March with Macías") militia/youth group, and the Esangui clan of Río Muni. The country's instruments of repression (military, presidential bodyguard) were entirely controlled by Macías Nguema's relatives and clan members. The JMM became increasingly powerful, and its members abused their powers, often drunkenly harassing and imprisoning individuals based on mere suspicions of sympathy for dissident ideas. The President mostly filled his inner circle with family members such as Teodoro Obiang Nguema Mbasogo, who was his nephew and served as military governor of Bioko and Vice-Minister of the Armed Forces. Macías Nguema also developed an extreme cult of personality, and assigned himself titles such as the "Unique Miracle" and "Grand Master of Education, Science, and Culture". The island of Fernando Pó had its name Africanised after him to Masie Ngueme Biyogo Island; upon his overthrow in 1979, its name was again changed to Bioko. The capital, Santa Isabel, had its name changed to Malabo. His cult of personality even infiltrated the Catholic Church in Equatorial Guinea, as priests were ordered to thank the President before mass, while pictures of him were placed in churches. At the Iglesia de San Fernando in Malabo a photo of the President was adorned with the statement "God created Equatorial Guinea thanks to Macías".

Macías Nguema also suffered from extreme paranoia, and saw plots against his life and rule everywhere. As time went on, he ordered the mass murder of government ministers, members of National Assembly, officials, and even members of his own family. Intellectuals and skilled professionals were a particular target, with human rights researcher Robert af Klinteberg describing Macías Nguema's policy as "deliberate cultural regression". The president's paranoid actions included mandating the death of those who wore glasses, banning use of the word "intellectual" and destroying boats to stop his people fleeing from his rule (fishing was banned). He was known to order entire villages destroyed just to eliminate one suspected dissident. His prisons, most importantly Black Beach, were notorious for human rights abuses; prisoners were humiliated, starved, tortured, and murdered without due process. When there was a trial at all, dissidents faced Kangaroo courts organized by the JMM militia, as almost all judges in the country fled or were jailed during Macías Nguema's rule. In one of these show trials in 1974, even the defence team of the accused requested a death sentence for their clients. Prisoners sentenced to death were usually beaten to death with wooden clubs. Female prisoners were also subjected to rape, often in front of their husbands. Macías Nguema's regime often imprisoned entire families, including the spouses and children of suspected dissidents. The abuse in the prisons was overseen by Teodoro who reportedly enjoyed mocking and torturing the prisoners. Among the few people who could still convince Macías Nguema to spare suspected dissidents were his relatives, such as Raimundo Ela Nve Senior, though his circle of confidants grew ever smaller.

Last years 

Growing increasingly paranoid, Macías Nguema no longer slept at the presidential palace from around 1974 and visited the capital on ever more rare occasions. Instead, he began holing up in a fortified villa at his home village of Mongomo; the location had a private bunker as well as prison and was protected by a military camp. The villa's private prison usually housed about 300 inmates, and the President occasionally personally executed some of them. As time went on, Macías Nguema's actions became ever more bizarre. He declared private education subversive, and banned it entirely with Decree 6 on 18 March 1975. He Africanized his name to "Masie Nguema Biyogo Ñegue Ndong" in 1976 after demanding that the rest of the Equatoguinean population replace their Hispanic names with African names. He also banned Western medicines, stating that they were un-African. He eventually outlawed Christianity, and used the slogan (sometimes claimed to be the national motto) "There is no other God than Macías". Owning anything related to Christianity became a reason for imprisonment due to alleged support for anti-government plots or coup attempts.

Following his repeated purges and unpredictable policies, the country's government began to fall apart. During Macías Nguema's rule, the country had neither a development plan nor an accounting system for government funds. After the killing of the governor of the Central Bank, he carried everything that remained in the national treasury to his Mongomo villa. Statisticians were also heavily repressed, and as a consequence, little economic data was generated on Equatorial Guinea during the 1970s. When the Equatorial Guinean director of the Institute of Statistics, Saturnin Antonio Ndongo, published demographic data considered too low by Macías, he was dismembered to "help him learn to count".

Tens of thousands of citizens responded by fleeing in fear of persecution and to protect their personal safety. Af Klinteberg reported that as of 1978, at least 101,000 persons, out of a contemporary population that the World Bank estimates totalled 215,284 persons—nearly 47% of the population—had fled the country. Other reporting, such as a 1979 Time magazine account stating that "perhaps 150,000" persons fled, suggests that the proportion of the population that sought safety in exile may have approached 70%, based on the World Bank's estimate of the population in 1979. By the end of his rule, nearly all of the country's educated class was either executed or forced into exile—a brain drain from which the country has never recovered. Two-thirds of the legislature and 10 of his original ministers were also killed or had been disappeared. To prevent people from escaping, Macías Nguema had the only road out of the country mined, and camouflaged ditches with spikes constructed along the mainland border. In 1976, Nigeria evacuated 45,000 contract laborers from the country, citing "brutal ill treatment" by Macías Nguema's regime. In 1977, responding to falling cocoa production (one of the country's main export items), the President instituted a "system of slavery". During his presidency, his country was nicknamed the "Dachau of Africa", after a Nazi concentration camp.

By 1978, a United States House of Representatives joint resolution condemning him for acts of religious persecution and genocide had been proposed. By 1979, his servants stated that Macías Nguema had become increasingly withdrawn, often spending the time mostly alone at his Mongomo villa. He would wander around, repeatedly saying the names of his victims, and worshipping a collection of heads as per Fang tradition, hoping that this would grant him power. Even more disturbing to the servants was one occasion, however, when he ordered a meal and table to be prepared for eight guests. He then sat there alone, casually talking "with the dead". Members of Macías Nguema's inner circle and government officials became more and more worried about his erratic behavior; at this point, the government had mostly ceased to function, as most minister posts were vacant, officials were no longer paid, the National Assembly was effectively defunct, while the JMM militia ran amok across Equatorial Guinea, drunkenly murdering civilians. The overcrowding of the prisons was solved through regular mass executions, though many prisoners were simply left to starve to death. Even the presidential guards were forced to survive by scavenging fruits and hunting wild animals, as supply had mostly collapsed. In mid-April 1979, Macías Nguema's wife travelled to North Korea for surgery, taking their three younger children, Monique, Maribel, and Paco with her.

Overthrow 

By 1979, Macías Nguema's government had garnered condemnation from the United Nations and European Commission. That summer, Macías Nguema organised the execution of several members of his own family, leading several members of his inner circle to fear that he was no longer acting rationally. On 3 August 1979 he was overthrown by Teodoro Obiang Nguema Mbasogo, whose brother was among those murdered by the President. Obiang achieved his coup mostly with the help of his cousins with whom he had previously attended a Spanish military academy together and who now headed the military. As Macías Nguema was still at his palace, isolated from the rest of the country due to his fear of being overthrown, the coup met no organized opposition.

The deposed ruler and a contingent of loyal forces initially tried to resist the coup upon hearing of it, but his forces eventually abandoned him. He fled into the jungle of Rio Muni, possibly intending to get across the border into exile, but was captured on 18 August. The former President was found by an old woman; he was exhausted and probably delirious, sitting beneath a tree and eating sugarcane. Obiang's troops proceeded to arrest him, and found his nearby car stuffed full of suitcases with $4 million in cash. However, it was believed that Macías Nguema had actually burned 100 million dollars (much of Equatorial Guinea's cash reserves) before attempting to escape the country. When his wife heard of his overthrow, she returned to Equatorial Guinea to protect their eldest son. Monique, Maribel, and Paco remained behind for their own safety, and consequently lived in North Korea for the remainder of their childhood. Monique stated that Kim Il-sung honored his friendship to Macías Nguema by acting as their guardian and financing their education.

Trial and execution
The Supreme Military Council opened Case 1979 on 18 August 1979, and began interviewing witnesses and collecting evidence against the Macías Nguema government. The Council subsequently convened a military tribunal on 24 September to try Macías Nguema and several members of his government. The charges for the ten defendants included genocide, mass murder, embezzlement of public funds, violations of human rights, and treason. Besides the deposed President, the accused were described by Kenyon as "bit-part actors" who had held no important positions under the old regime; their presence was supposed to make the trial look more legitimate. Macías Nguema appeared generally calm and unafraid during the trial.

The state prosecutor requested that Macías Nguema receive the death penalty, five others receive thirty years in prison, and four others receive a year in prison. Macías Nguema's defense counsel countered that the other co-defendants were responsible for specific crimes, and asked for acquittal. Macías Nguema himself delivered a statement to the court outlining what he viewed as the extensive good deeds he had performed for the country. At noon on 29 September 1979, the Tribunal delivered its sentences, which were more severe than what the prosecution had requested. Macías Nguema and six of his co-defendants were sentenced to death and the confiscation of their property; Nguema being sentenced to death "101 times". Two defendants were sentenced to fourteen years in prison each, and two others to four years each.

With no higher court available to hear appeals, the decision of the Special Military Tribunal was final. However, one problem arose, as Macías Nguema reportedly swore that his ghost would return and take revenge on those who had condemned him. The Equatoguinean soldiers consequently refused to shoot him. A group of hired Moroccan troops was instead employed to carry out the sentence. 55-year old Macías Nguema and the six other defendants sentenced to death were executed by the hired firing squad at Black Beach Prison at 6 pm on the same day.

Macías Nguema's wider clan, led by Teodoro Obiang Nguema Mbasogo, still rules Equatorial Guinea as of today. By 2007, his children had all left North Korea. However, 
Macías Nguema's daughter Monique had relocated to South Korea, considering Korea her home and Korean her native tongue; she had published a Korean-language memoir about her own life. Macías Nguema's wife and daughter Maribel live in Spain, and his sons in Equatorial Guinea.

Notes

References

Works cited

Further reading
 Jensen, Geoffrey (2019). "Tyranny, Communism, and U.S. Policy in Equatorial Guinea, 1968–1979". Diplomatic History.

External links

1924 births
1979 deaths
Deified people
People from Mongomo
Leaders ousted by a coup
Heads of government who were later imprisoned
Executed presidents
20th-century executions by Equatorial Guinea
People executed by Equatorial Guinea by firing squad
Executed Equatoguinean people
Equatoguinean people convicted of murder
Equatoguinean people convicted of genocide
People convicted of murder by Equatorial Guinea
People convicted of embezzlement
People convicted of treason
Presidents for life
Presidents of Equatorial Guinea
Foreign ministers of Equatorial Guinea
People from Río Muni
Equatoguinean people of Gabonese descent
Executed mass murderers